Capel Curig (meaning "Curig's Chapel") is a village and community in Conwy County Borough, Wales. Historically in Caernarfonshire, it lies in the heart of Snowdonia, on the River Llugwy, and has a population of 226, reducing slightly to 206 at the 2011 census.  It lies at the junction of the A5 road from Bangor and Bethesda to Betws-y-Coed with the A4086 road from Caernarfon, Llanberis, Pen-y-Pass and Pen-y-Gwryd. It is surrounded by hills and mountains, including Moel Siabod and Pen Llithrig y Wrach.

Name
Capel Curig takes its name from the little St Julitta's Church in the ancient graveyard by the river bridge on the Llanberis road. This, confusingly, has been known for over 100 years as St Julitta's Church, and is currently being restored by the "Friends of Saint Julitta".  Tradition claims this chapel to be the 6th-century foundation of St Curig, a Celtic bishop.  Centuries later, probably when the present ancient church was built, the name appears to have been Latinised as Cyricus, which is the name of a 4th-century child martyr whose mother was Julitta. They are usually named together as Saints Quiricus and Julietta.

The names Capel Kiryg and Capel Kerig were recorded in 1536 and 1578 respectively.

Roman fort
Approximately one kilometre from Pont Cyfyng, on the farm of Bryn Gefeiliau, there are the remains of a Roman fort (c.90–100 AD) and named Caer Llugwy by its excavators. (OS Grid Reference SH746572). Stone buildings were uncovered and traced. The rectangular walled area is on flat land close to the River Llugwy. From the pottery and finds in 1923 and subsequently, it appears to have only been garrisoned for 20–30 years.

Activity centre

The village is a popular centre for walking, climbing, mountaineering, mountain biking and other outdoor pursuits and is served by the Sherpa bus network.  It is also home to an Army training camp, a camp site, several cafes and hotels and outdoor activity gear shops, and, formerly, a youth hostel.

Wolverhampton City Council have since 1961 operated 'The Towers' outdoors activity centre just outside Capel Curig. The centre facilitates walking, climbing, a variety of watersports and field studies on a schedule that is adapted day to day according to the prevailing weather conditions and to the abilities and needs of individuals and groups.

Also located in Capel Curig is the UK National Mountain Centre at Plas y Brenin, which offers the highest quality mountaineering, climbing, canoeing facilities and training. One mile east of the village on the A5 is Tŷ Hyll, home of the Snowdonia Society

Culture 
Capel Curig is mentioned in the song Bottleneck at Capel Curig by cult UK band Half Man Half Biscuit on their album Trouble Over Bridgwater.
 
Capel Curig is the setting for the climax of the 1956 thriller The Hidden Face by Victor Canning.

Welsh language 
According to the 2011 Census, 57.1% of the community's population aged 3 years or over could speak Welsh, with 82.5% of the Welsh-born population aged 3+ being able to speak Welsh. 54.3% of the community's population could speak Welsh in 2001.

49.5% of the community's population aged 3 years or over could speak, read and write Welsh in 2011.

Climate
As with much of the rest of the British Isles, Capel Curig experiences a temperate maritime climate (Cfb), with warm summers and cold winters, little extremes of temperature and high humidity year round. Capel Curig is one of the wettest places in the UK and the wettest in Wales.

Evan Roberts
Capel Curig was home to the botanist Evan Roberts (1909–1991). Roberts lived at Gelli, from where he explored all of Snowdonia, and compiled an unparalleled knowledge of the plant life of North Wales.  Although he spent the first 40 years of his life as a quarry worker, he went on to become the colleague of academics. He was awarded the honorary degree of M.Sc. of the University of Wales, in 1956, at the same ceremony as the architect Frank Lloyd Wright, and his portrait was painted by Kyffin Williams.

See also
 Cobden's Hotel

References

External links 

 A Vision of Britain Through Time
 British Listed Buildings
 Capel Curig—The Heart of Snowdonia
 Genuki
Geograph
Gwydyr Mountaineering Club
 History of Capel Curig
 Plas y Brenin—The National Mountain Sports Centre
 Office for National Statistics